Borodin, or Borodina (feminine; Бородина́) is a Russian surname. Notable people with the name include:

 Alexander Borodin (1833–1887), Russian composer and chemist
 Alexei Borodin (born 1975), Ukrainian-born professor of mathematics at MIT
 Allan Borodin, American mathematician and computational theorist
 Anastasiia Borodina (born 1982), Ukrainian handball player
 Andrey Borodin (born 1967), former President of Bank of Moscow
 Dmitri Borodin, (born 1977), Russian football goalkeeper
 Ilya Borodin (footballer), (born 1976), Russian footballer
 Ilya Borodin, (born 2003), Russian swimmer
 Ivan Parfenievich Borodin, (1847 - 1930), Russian botanist 
 Leonid Borodin (1938–2011), Russian novelist
 Mikhail Borodin (1884–1951), Soviet agent in China
 Olga Borodina (born 1963), Russian opera mezzo-soprano
 Pavel Borodin (born 1946), Russian politician, member of Boris Yeltsin's administration
 Piotr Borodin (1905–?), Moldavian politician
 Sergei Borodin (disambiguation), multiple people, including:
Sergei Borodin (footballer, born 1988), Russian football player
Sergei Borodin (footballer, born 1999), Russian football player
 Tatiana Borodina, Russian opera soprano

Fictional characters
 Kostia Borodin, character from the novel Gorky Park
 Vasily Borodin, executive officer on the submarine Red October in the book and film The Hunt for Red October

Russian-language surnames